The secretary of the Council of Ministers is a senior member of the Italian Cabinet. The secretary is one of the undersecretaries of state to the Presidency of the Council of Ministers but, unlike them, he sits in the Cabinet and helps the prime minister in coordinating the government and its meetings. Thus, the secretary is usually a person very close to the prime minister. The secretary of the Council of Ministers, which may not be confused with the largely ceremonial office of Deputy Prime Minister (not all Italian Cabinets include one), resembles that of the White House chief of staff. 

The current secretary of the Council of Ministers is Alfredo Mantovano, appointed on 22 October 2022 in the government led by Prime Minister Giorgia Meloni.

List
Parties:
1946–1994:

1994–present:

Coalitions:

See also
Politics of Italy
Council of Ministers (Italy)
Prime Minister of Italy
List of prime ministers of Italy
Deputy Prime Minister of Italy
Lists of office-holders

References

Politics of Italy